"You've Never Been This Far Before" is a song written and recorded by American country music artist Conway Twitty. It was released in July 1973 as the second single and title track from the album You've Never Been This Far Before.

Content 
The song was controversial at the time of its release, with several radio stations banning it, due to what were considered by some to be overly sexual lyrics.

Personnel
Conway Twitty — vocals
Joe E. Lewis, The Nashville Sounds — vocals
Harold Bradley — 6-string electric bass guitar
Ray Edenton — acoustic guitar
Johnny Gimble — fiddle
John Hughey — steel guitar, dobro
Tommy Markham — drums
Grady Martin — electric guitar
Bob Moore — bass
Hargus "Pig" Robbins — piano

Chart performance
The song was Twitty's 10th number one on the country chart as a solo artist. The single stayed at number one for three weeks and spent a total of 16 weeks on the chart.

"You've Never Been This Far Before" was Twitty's only song from the country chart to cross over onto the Top 40 of the Billboard Hot 100, where the single peaked at number 22.

Conway Twitty

Carroll Baker
Canadian singer Carroll Baker released a version titled "I've Never Been This Far Before". This version of the song reached number one on the RPM Country Tracks chart in Canada in May 1975.

References

1975 singles
Carroll Baker songs
Conway Twitty songs
1973 singles
Billboard Hot Country Songs number-one singles of the year
Songs written by Conway Twitty
Song recordings produced by Owen Bradley
MCA Records singles
1973 songs